Ba County may refer to:

 Banan District, Chongqing, formerly Ba County
 Bazhou, Hebei, formerly Ba County